Christopher W. Eachus (born October 8, 1955) is an American politician serving as a member of the New York State Assembly from the 99th district, which covers parts of Orange and Rockland Counties. Eachus is a member of the Democratic Party.

Early life and education 

Eachus was born in San Mateo California, and spent his early years in Peru until his family settled on Long Island. He graduated with a master's degree from SUNY New Paltz. He made a career as a high school teacher for 40 years.

Political Career 

Eachus served 12 years (3 terms) as a member of the Orange County Legislature, representing the 15th district from 2004-2016. He ran for New York State Senate twice against long-time incumbent William J. Larkin Jr., losing in 2012 and 2016.

New York State Assembly 

Eachus declared his candidacy for New York State Assembly in early 2022. With incumbent Assemblyman Colin Schmitt running for Congress, the 99th Assembly district seat became open. Fellow Democratic candidate Zak Constantine withdrew from the race following Eachus's entry. Eachus defeated Republican Kathryn Luciani, a Town Councilwoman from Woodbury, by 8 votes after a recount. Eachus was the only Democrat to flip a previously Republican Assembly seat in 2022.

He serves on the Aging, Higher Education, Local Governments, Mental Health, and Veterans' Affairs committees in the Assembly.

Electoral History

Orange County Legislature

New York State Senate

New York State Assembly

References 

1955 births
Living people